Vernon Center is the name of some communities in the United States:

 Vernon Center, Minnesota, a small city
 Vernon Center Township, Blue Earth County, Minnesota
 Former name of Durand, Michigan